The  New York Giants season was the franchise's 11th season in the National Football League.

Schedule

Game Summaries

Week 2: at Pittsburgh Pirates

Week 3: at Green Bay Packers

Week 4: at Boston Redskins

Week 5: vs. Brooklyn Dodgers

Week 6: vs. Boston Redskins

Week 7: vs. Chicago Cardinals

Week 8: vs. Chicago Bears

Week 10: at Chicago Bears

Week 11: vs. Philadelphia Eagles

Week 12, Game 1: at Brooklyn Dodgers

Week 12, Game 2: at Philadelphia Eagles

Week 13: vs. Pittsburgh Pirates

Playoffs

Championship Game: at Detroit Lions

Standings

See also
List of New York Giants seasons

References
1935 Giants season at Pro Football Reference

New York Giants seasons
New York Giants
New York
1930s in Manhattan
Washington Heights, Manhattan